The Cortes of Castilla–La Mancha (Spanish: Cortes de Castilla-La Mancha) is the unicameral legislature of Castilla–La Mancha, an autonomous community of Spain. The Cortes consists of 33 elected deputies. 
The Cortes of Castilla–La Mancha represent the popular will through 33 deputies elected by  universal adult suffrage through the secret ballot.

Electoral system

Deputies are elected for a term of four years under a proportional system intended to guarantee representation to the various territorial zones of Castile–La Mancha. The electoral constituency is at the level of each province, with provinces being assigned the following number of deputies as of 2015: Albacete, 6; Ciudad Real, 8; Cuenca, 5; Guadalajara, 5; and Toledo, 9.

Article 10 of the Statute of Autonomy states that elections will be convoked by the President of the Junta of Communities, following the General Electoral Regime (Régimen Electoral General), on the fourth Sunday in May every four years. This stands in contrast to the autonomous communities of the Basque Country, Catalonia, Galicia, Andalusia and the Valencian Community  where the president has the power to call elections at any time.

Composition

Since the 26 May 2019, the Cortes of Castile–La Mancha has consisted of 10 deputies from the conservative People's Party, 19 from the social-democratic PSOE and 4 from the center-right Cs. The Cortes sits in the former Franciscan convent in Toledo, the Convento de San Gil.

List of presidents of the Cortes of Castilla–La Mancha 

 I Legislatura: Francisco Javier de Irízar Ortega (1983–1987)
 II Legislatura: José Manuel Martínez Cenzano (1987–1991)
 III Legislatura: José María Barreda (1991–1995)
 IV Legislatura: José María Barreda (1995–1997)
 IV Legislatura: María Carmen Blázquez Martínez (1997–1999)
 V Legislatura: Antonio Marco Martínez (1999–2003)
 VI Legislatura: Fernando López Carrasco (2003–2007)
 VII Legislatura: Francisco Pardo Piqueras (2007–2011)
 VIII Legislatura: Vicente Tirado Ochoa (2011–2015)
 IX Legislatura: Jesús Fernández Vaquero (2015-2019)
 X Legislatura: Pablo Bellido (2019–present)

References

 
1982 establishments in Castilla–La Mancha
Castilla-La Mancha